Marc Pilisuk (born January 19, 1934) is a Peace and Conflict Studies scholar and Professor Emeritus of the University of California system, having taught at UC-Davis and UC-Berkeley. He currently teaches and supervises graduate students at Saybrook University. Pilisuk is the author of Hidden Structure of Violence: Who Benefits from Global Violence and War, a coauthor of The Triple Revolution, the author of Poor Americans: How the White Poor Live, a coauthor of The Healing Web: Social Networks and Human Survival, a coauthor of International Conflict and Social Policy, a co-editor of the three-volume anthology Peace Movements Worldwide and the author or coauthor of over one hundred academic journal articles.

In 1961, Pilisuk earned a Ph.D. from the University of Michigan in clinical and social psychology.

Pilisuk is a founder of the Psychologists for Social Responsibility and past president of The Society for Study of Peace, Conflict and Violence (Division 48 of the American Psychological Association).

In 2012, Dr. Pilisuk was awarded The Howard Zinn Lifetime Achievement Award from the Peace and Justice Studies Association.

In 2019, Pilisuk was awarded the Lifetime Achievement Award from the California Psychological Association

References 

1934 births
Living people
21st-century American psychologists
Saybrook University faculty
University of California, Berkeley faculty
University of California, Davis faculty
University of Michigan alumni
20th-century American psychologists